The Islamic Azad University, Karaj Branch (Persian: دانشگاه آزاد اسلامی واحد کرج, Dāneshgāh-e Āzād-e Eslāmi vahed-e Karaj) is the private university and one of the branches of the Islamic Azad University located in Karaj, Alborz, Iran.

History
It started its activities in 1984 with 500 students who studied in 7 fields of study. Nowadays this big university complex consists of 13 faculties, 1 independent department and 4 research centers.
As of October 2016, the university is ranked as the 629th best university in the world according to U.S. News & World Report.

Faculties
 Faculty of Engineering
 Faculty of Data Science and Artificial Intelligence
 Faculty of Science
 Faculty of Vocation and Entrepreneurship
 Faculty of Veterinary Medicine
 Faculty of Medical Sciences
 Faculty of Agriculture and Environmental Resources
 Faculty of Persian Literature and Foreign Languages
 Faculty of Management and Accounting
 Faculty of Law and Political Sciences
 Faculty of Theology and Islamic Studies
 Faculty of Physical Education and Sport Sciences
 Faculty of Psychology and Education
 Independent Department of Islamic Education

Faculty of Engineering
Department of Civil Engineering and Surveying Engineering (BS, MS)
Department of Industrial Engineering (BS, MS)
Department of Materials Engineering (BS, MS, PhD)
Department of Architecture and Urban Engineering (BA, MA, PhD)

See also

 Higher education in Iran
 List of universities in Iran
 Islamic Azad University

References

External links
 Official Website 

Karaj, Islamic Azad University of
Karaj
Education in Alborz Province
Buildings and structures in Alborz Province